Arnhem ( or ; ; South Guelderish: Èrnem) is a city and municipality situated in the eastern part of the Netherlands. It is the capital of the province of Gelderland, located on both banks of the rivers Nederrijn and Sint-Jansbeek, which was the source of the city's development. Arnhem had a population of 163,972 on 1 December 2021, which made it one of the larger cities of the Netherlands. The municipality is part of the Arnhem–Nijmegen metropolitan area, which has a combined number of 774,506 inhabitants on 31 January 2022.

Arnhem is home to the Hogeschool van Arnhem en Nijmegen, ArtEZ Institute of the Arts, Netherlands Open Air Museum, Airborne Museum 'Hartenstein', Royal Burgers' Zoo, NOC*NSF and National Sports Centre Papendal. The north corner of the municipality is part of the Hoge Veluwe National Park.

History

Early history 

The oldest archeological findings of human activity around Arnhem are two firestones of about 70,000 years ago. These come from the Stone Age, when the Neanderthals lived in this part of Europe. In Schuytgraaf, remnants of a hunters camp from around 5000 BC have been discovered. In Schaarsbergen, twelve grave mounds were found from 2400 BC, which brought the so-called Neolithic Revolution to the area of Arnhem, which meant the rise of the farmers.

The earliest settlement in Arnhem dates from 1500 BC, of which traces have been found on the Hoogkamp, where the Van Goyenstraat is currently located. In the inner city, around the Sint-Jansbeek, traces of settlement have been found from around 700 BC, while the first traces south of the Rhine have been found dating to around 500 BC, in the Schuytgraaf.

Though the early tracks of settlements did show that the early residents of Arnhem descended from the forests on the hills, Arnhem was not built on the banks of the river Rhine, but a little higher along the Sint-Jansbeek. Arnhem arose on the location where the road between Nijmegen and Utrecht and Zutphen split. Seven streams provided the city with water, and only when the flow of the Rhine was changed in 1530, was the city located on the river.

Middle Ages 

Arnhem was first mentioned as such in 893 as Arneym or Arentheym. In 1233, Count Otto II of Guelders from Zutphen, conferred city rights on the town, which had belonged to the abbey of Prüm, settled in, and fortified it. Arnhem entered the Hanseatic League in 1443. In 1473, it was captured by Charles the Bold of Burgundy.

16th and 17th century 

In 1514, Charles of Egmond, duke of Guelders, took it from the dukes of Burgundy; in 1543, it fell to the emperor Charles V. As capital of the so-called "Kwartier van Veluwe" it joined the Union of Utrecht during the Eighty Years' War in 1579. After its capture from the Spanish forces by Dutch and English troops in 1585 the city became part of the Republic of the Seven United Provinces of the Netherlands. The French occupied the town from 1672 to 1674.

18th and 19th century 

From 1795 to 1813, it was reoccupied by the French, by both revolutionary and imperial forces.

In the early 19th century, the former fortifications were almost completely dismantled, to give space for town expansion. The Sabelspoort (Sabresgate) is the only remaining part of the medieval walls.

In the 19th century, Arnhem was a genteel resort town famous for its picturesque beauty. It was known as "het Haagje van het oosten" (The Little Hague of the East), mainly because a number of rich former sugar barons or planters from the Indies settled there, as they did in The Hague. Even now the city is famous for its parks and greenery. The urbanization in the north on hilly terrain is also quite unusual for the Netherlands.

The Battle of Arnhem 

In the Second World War (1939–1945), during Operation Market Garden (September 1944), the British 1st Airborne Division, under the command of Major-General Roy Urquhart, and the Polish 1st Independent Parachute Brigade were given the task of securing the bridge at Arnhem.

Glider infantry and paratrooper units were landed into the area on 17 September and later.  The bulk of the force was dropped rather far from the bridge and never met their objective.  A small element of the British 1st Airborne, the 2nd Parachute Battalion under Lieutenant Colonel John D. Frost, managed to make its way as far as the bridge but was unable to secure both sides. The British troops encountered stiff resistance from the German 9th and 10th SS Panzer Divisions, which had been stationed in and around the city.

The British force at the bridge eventually ran out of ammunition and was captured on 21 September, and a full withdrawal of the remaining forces was made on 26 September. These events were dramatized in the 1977 movie A Bridge Too Far. (The bridge scenes in the movie were shot in Deventer, where a similar bridge over the IJssel was available, as the area around Arnhem bridge had changed too much to represent WWII-era Arnhem). As a tribute, the rebuilt bridge was renamed 'John Frost Bridge' after the commander of the paratroopers. The official commemoration is 17 September.

The current bridge is the third almost-identical bridge built at the same spot. The Dutch Army destroyed the first bridge when the German Army invaded the Netherlands in 1940. The second bridge was destroyed by the United States Army Air Forces shortly after the 1944 battle.

Liberation 

A second battle of Arnhem took place in April 1945 when the city was liberated by the British 49th (West Riding) Infantry Division fighting as part of the First Canadian Army. The inhabitants of the city, who had been forcibly evacuated by the Germans during and after the battle, returned in the summer of 1945. The reconstruction of Arnhem took until 1969 to finally be completed.

Just outside Arnhem, in the town of Oosterbeek the Commonwealth War Graves Commission built the Arnhem Oosterbeek War Cemetery which contains the graves of most of those killed during the September landings, and many of those killed in later fighting in the area.

The city also hosted the 1980 Summer Paralympics.

Geography

Neighbourhoods 

The municipality of Arnhem consists of the city of Arnhem and the following surrounding suburbs and former villages:
 Elden, Netherlands (former village, now totally surrounded by other Arnhem neighbourhoods)
 Schaarsbergen

Arnhem consists of three districts (stadsdelen) and 24 neighbourhoods (wijken). Each neighbourhood has a number which corresponds to its postal code.

 Arnhem Centrum (Binnenstad) 
 Arnhem-North (Spijkerkwartier, Arnhemse Broek, Presikhaaf-West, Presikhaaf-East, St. Marten/Sonsbeek-Zuid, Klarendal, Velperweg, Alteveer en Cranevelt, Geitenkamp, Monnikenhuizen, Burgemeesterswijk/Hoogkamp, Heijenoord/Lombok, Klingelbeek) 
 Arnhem-South (Malburgen-West, Malburgen-East (North), Malburgen-East (South), De Laar East/West, Vredenburg/Kronenburg, Elderveld, Rijkerswoerd, Schuytgraaf)

Neighbouring villages 
The outlying areas of the following villages are bordering the municipality of Arnhem directly, which means among others that in many a case a considerable number of their inhabitants originate from Arnhem.

 Velp
 Oosterbeek
 Driel
 Elst
 Huissen
 Wolfheze
 Rozendaal
 Westervoort

Proximity of border with Germany 

The city lies a few kilometers from the border with Germany, and to some extent the westernmost villages in the municipality of Elten, Germany, function as dormitories for people who work in the Dutch city of Arnhem in part due to the immigration of Dutch people from the region that were attracted by the lower house pricing just across the border.

Climate 

Arnhem features the same climate (Cfb, oceanic climate) as all of the Netherlands; however, its location on the foothills of the Veluwe, the largest forest in the Netherlands, contributes to some higher precipitation values.

Demographics

Inhabitants by nationality

Places of interest 

The Grote Kerk (St. Eusebius' Church), built 1452–1560, lost most of its tower during World War II, of which a part has been reconstructed to a modern design and opened in 1964. Officially the tower is not part of the church and is owned by the municipality.

The house of Maarten van Rossum, a general serving Duke Charles van Gelre, has been the town hall since 1830: The satyrs in its Renaissance ornamentation earned it the name Duivelshuis (devil's house). The Netherlands Open Air Museum is located outside the city. It includes antique houses, farms, factories, and windmills from different parts of the Netherlands. Two other windmills stand in Arnhem itself, De Hoop and De Kroon.

The Royal Burgers' Zoo in Arnhem is one of the biggest and most-visited zoos in the Netherlands, featuring an underwater walkthrough, desert, mangrove, and rainforest. The GelreDome, the home of Vitesse Arnhem, the city's Eredivisie team in football, is a unique facility that features a retractable roof and a slide-out grass pitch. The concept has been fully duplicated since then by the Veltins-Arena in Gelsenkirchen, Germany, and State Farm Stadium in Glendale, Arizona, U.S., and partially by the Sapporo Dome in Japan (which has a sliding pitch but a fixed roof).

The KEMA Toren (formerly known as SEP Control Tower) is the highest structure of the town. It is a 140-m-high TV tower.

Parks

Museums in and around Arnhem

Buildings and locations

Events 

Airborne Commemoration (17-26 September)
World Statues Festival (The World Championship of Living Statues)
Sonsbeek Theater Avenue 
Free Your Mind Festival
Dancetour
8Bahn
De Rabo Bridge to Bridge (Marathon)
UITboulevard (Cultural Festival)
Sprookjesfestival (Fairy tale Festival)
King's Day
Sinterklaas
hoogte 80

Sport 

The National Sports Centre Papendal is the national sports development centre of the Netherlands, located in Arnhem. The first event held at Papendal was the 1980 Summer Paralympics, from 21 June to 5 July. However the site was formally adopted and developed from 1993, after the merger of the Dutch National Olympic Committee (NOC) and the Nederlandse Sport Federatie (NSF).

NOC*NSF have 90 affiliated national sports organizations, representing about 2700 individual sports clubs. Papendal is also the training location of football club Vitesse Arnhem, and the club's youth development system. Supporting facilities include a conference centre and hotel.

In preparation for the 2012 Summer Olympics, in 2011 the facility built a replica of the proposed BMX racing track at the London Velopark venue. The track will host the second event on the 2011 UCI BMX World Championships, on 27 and 28 May 2011.

Since January 2013 Sports Centre Papendal officially split from NOC * NSF and thus as organization demerges. This split offers Sports Centre Papendal many commercial benefits. There are facilities for various sports, including athletics, cycling and more.

Sport in the city is principally focussed on its association football club Vitesse Arnhem and its stadium the GelreDome built for the UEFA Euro 2000. The club has enjoyed some success in the Eredivisie and has featured in the UEFA Cup competition. Their best result in the Eredivisie was third place in 1997–98. The club won the KNVB Cup in 2016–17.

Introdans is a dance company based in the city of Arnhem. In 2009 the Ministry of Education, Culture and Science designated Introdans part of the basic national infrastructure. In 2016 was the Giro d'Italia in Arnhem.

Transport 

Arnhem has had a main central railway station since 1845 – Arnhem Centraal railway station, which is serviced by several intercity lines and the Intercity-Express to Düsseldorf and further on to Frankfurt.

Until 2016, there were also NS International trains to other destinations abroad, with some coaches going as far as Moscow.

The intercity lines provide direct connections to Utrecht, Nijmegen and Zutphen. It is also the terminus for several local railway services. Arnhem has three other stations, namely Arnhem Velperpoort (since 1953), Arnhem Presikhaaf (since 1969) and Arnhem Zuid (since 2005).

KLM operates a bus from the train station to Schiphol Airport for its customers. Arnhem is unique in the Netherlands with its trolleybus system.

Notable people

Truus van Aalten (1910–1999), actress
Afro Brothers (2016), electronic/urban DJ duo
Blaudzun (1974), singer-songwriter
Marion Bloem (1952), writer and film maker
Hetty Blok (1920–2012), cabaret artist, singer, and actress
Edmond Classen (1938–2014), actor
Ien Dales (1931–1994), politician of the Labour Party (PvdA) 
Esmée Denters (1988), singer and YouTube celebrity
 Eva Duldig (born 1938), Austrian-born Australian and Dutch tennis player, author
Henk Guth (1921-2002), artist
Jan van Hooff (1936), biologist
Aarnoud van Heemstra (1871–1957), politician and maternal grandfather of Audrey Hepburn
Kenny van Hummel (1982), bicycle racer 
Rudolf Jansen (1940), pianist
Tania de Jong, Dutch-born Australian soprano and entrepreneur; daughter of Eva Duldig
 Ferdi Kadıoğlu, (1999), Dutch-born Turkish player
Antonie Kamerling (1966–2010), actor and musician
Herman Koch (1953), writer and actor
Hendrik Lorentz (1853–1928), physicist and Nobel Prize laureate
Goos Meeuwsen (1982), circus artist
Leo Peelen (1968–2017), track cyclist
Estavana Polman (1992), handballer
Joran van der Sloot (1987), convicted murderer 
Mart Smeets (1947), radio and television host, and writer
Saar de Swart (1861-1951), sculptor
Rik Toonen (1954), water polo player, bronze medalist at the 1976 Summer Olympics
Linda Wagenmakers (1975), singer and voice actress

Facts and figures 

 Arnhem is the name of a march composed by A.E. Kelly.
 Arnhem Land in Australia is named after the VOC-ship Arnhem.
 Theirs is the Glory (a.k.a. Men of Arnhem), is a 1946 British war film about the British 1st Airborne Division's involvement in the Battle of Arnhem (17 to 25 September 1944) during Operation Market Garden in the Second World War. Another film, A Bridge Too Far, tells the story of the failure of Operation Market Garden in Arnhem.

Twin towns – sister cities

Arnhem is twinned with:

 Coventry, England, United Kingdom
 Croydon, England, United Kingdom
 Gera, Germany
 Hradec Králové, Czech Republic
 Kimberley, South Africa
 Villa El Salvador, Peru

 Airdrie, Scotland, United Kingdom

See also 
 Arnhem Metal Meeting
 Carruthers, B. 2013. (ed) Arnhem 1944 A Bridge Too Far. Pen & Sword

References

External links 

Municipality Official website (English version)
VVV Arnhem  Tourist Office (English version)
Commonwealth War Graves Commission The CWGC Page for the cemetery.

 
Cities in the Netherlands
Municipalities of Gelderland
Populated places in Gelderland
Populated places on the Rhine
Provincial capitals of the Netherlands
Members of the Hanseatic League